The Lotus 21 was a Formula One racing car  designed by Colin Chapman. It was a mid-engined design using a tubular spaceframe structure skinned with fibreglass panels, of a more advanced build than seen in the Lotus 18. Powered by the 1.5-litre Coventry Climax FPF 4-cylinder engine, it used disc brakes all round.

Used by the works Lotus team and the privateer Rob Walker Racing Team in 1961, the 21 was the first works Lotus to win a Formula One Grand Prix, in the hands of Innes Ireland at the 1961 United States Grand Prix. (Previous victories were taken by Rob Walker's team). Customer teams continued to use it up to 1965. It was soon rendered obsolete by the Lotus 24 and the monocoque Lotus 25 introduced for the 1962 Formula One season.

Scale models and die cast
Meccano Dinky Toys; No. 241 (production 1963–1969), approximately O scale (1:44).

Complete Formula One World Championship results

1 17 points were scored using the Lotus 21, the other 15 points were scored using other Lotus models
2 All points were scored using other Lotus models

References

21